Out for the Night, an album by The Battlefield Band, was released in 2004 on the Temple Records label.

Track listing
 "Ms. Dynamite of Benbecula/The Alewife T/Little Cascade/Culder's Rant" – 4:39
 "The Earl of Errol" – 4:11
 "Christ Church/Nuala Kennedy's Reel/Ambassador Craig Murray's Reel" – 4:25
 "Seudan a' Chuain (Jewels of the Ocean/The Grinder/Barbhas Agus Butthea" – 4:59
 "Belfast to Boston" – 6:03
 "The Anniversary Reel/Out for the Night" – 4:11
 "Rest and Be Thankful" – 3:43
 "The King's Shilling" – 3:41
 "An Cota Ruadh (The Red Coat)/Eastwood Cottage/Clisham/Captain Forbes' Reel/Keep the Country Bonnie Lassie" – 4:12
 "Bagad Kemper/Trouble at Baghdad Roundabout/McKenna's Jig" – 5:15
 "The Banks O' Carron Water" – 3:47
 "Bowmore Fair/Mary O'Neill's Reel/Tournemine et Gasdebois" – 4:04
 "Clan Coco/The Road to Benderloch/Fifteen Stubbies to Warragul" – 5:01
 "Lord Randall" – 5:09
 "Time & Tide/The Nine Pint Coggie/Drive Home the Mainlanders/The Mill House" – 7:14

Notes

Sources and links
 
 Album page from the band’s website

Battlefield Band albums
2004 albums